TVRI Jakarta (officially LPP TVRI Stasiun Jakarta) is a regional public television station owned by TVRI, serving Special Capital Region of Jakarta, Indonesia and surrounding areas. TVRI Jakarta studios are located in Jalan Gerbang Pemuda, Central Jakarta, the same place as the TVRI national headquarters.

The station airs on terrestrial analog and digital platforms, as well as via live streaming on the TVRI website and the TVRI Klik app.

History
The station began broadcasting on 1 January 1983 as Programa Dua TVRI (or simply Programa Dua or Programa 2), about six years later before the first Indonesian private television station RCTI is airing. The station is primarily serving Jakarta region from the very beginning, in the early years it was airing more urban-oriented programming than TVRI main channel (TVRI Nasional). The single first program to broadcast was English-language news TVRI News for half an hour at 18:30 WIB, under the responsibility of the News section.

On 26 March 2007, TVRI Jakarta was launched, probably transformed from Programa Dua. Later the station changed its name again to TVRI Jakarta & Banten, reflecting the station coverage which includes parts of Banten province (as Banten didn't yet have its own TVRI regional station).

As of 30 March 2019, the name changed back to TVRI Jakarta.

On 3 November 2022, at 12 am (WIB), TVRI Jakarta stopped broadcasting in analog in Jabodetabek, and is only available through terrestrial digital television broadcasts on channel 43 UHF (multiplexing TVRI Joglo).

Programming
In analog terrestrial, instead of acting as an opt-out local programming on TVRI Nasional (as in other TVRI regional stations), TVRI Jakarta is acting as a separate local channel from the very first broadcast. This kind of system is created so that the viewers had a choice between the TVRI national and regional channel. The system later implemented in the digital terrestrial broadcast of all TVRI regional stations, where the stations ideally has its own channel and did not need to opt-out from TVRI Nasional.

TVRI Jakarta programming included its local newscasts, Jakarta Hari Ini (Jakarta Today), which airs daily at 16.00 WIB.

As Banten Province does not have any TVRI station nor its own broadcast crews, TVRI Jakarta provides news crews and reporters assigned to the province as a ad-hoc news department for provincial news and feature stories also aired on Jakarta Hari Ini and station produced-programming targeting said province, as well as shared programs for the two provinces.

References

External links
 TVRI Jakarta information on TVRI website
 TVRI Jakarta official YouTube channel

Television stations in Indonesia
Television channels and stations established in 2007
2007 establishments in Indonesia
Mass media in Jakarta
TVRI